Fabio Wolfinger (born 11 May 1996) is a Liechtensteiner footballer who currently plays for FC Balzers.

International career
He is a member of the Liechtenstein national football team, making his debut in a friendly match against Qatar on 14 December 2017. Wolfinger also made 19 appearances for the Liechtenstein U21.

Personal life
Fabio is the youngest of three Wolfinger brothers to have been capped by the Liechtenstein senior team after Marco and Sandro.

International goals

References

1996 births
Living people
Liechtenstein footballers
Association football midfielders
Liechtenstein international footballers
FC Vaduz players
FC Balzers players
SC Rheindorf Altach players
Place of birth missing (living people)